Piptatherum pungens, also called Oryzopsis pungens, commonly called slender mountain-ricegrass, ricegrass, northern ricegrass, or slender mountain-rice, is a plant found in North America.  It is listed as endangered in Connecticut, Iowa, New Jersey, and Pennsylvania. It is listed as extirpated in Indiana, as a special concern in Rhode Island, and as threatened in Vermont.

References

Flora of North America
Pooideae